Namur-Suarlée Airfield  is a regional aerodrome in Belgium, located
   
It supports general aviation with no commercial airline service scheduled.

History
The airfield was opened on 26 October 1944 by the United States Army Air Forces IX Engineering Command as a grass liaison airfield for use by the Det 112, 112th Liaison Squadron and its light observation aircraft to support the numerous command and control organizations in Namur. Designated as Advanced Landing Ground "Y-47". In February 1945 the airfield received a  all-weather Pierced Steel Planking surface to allow operations during the winter of 1944–1945.

American military units remained in Namur until November 1945 before returning to the United States and the airfield was turned over to Belgian authorities. The metal runway was eventually removed and today a modern grass airfield is used by light aircraft and sailplanes.

In 2018, 06L/24R runway was converted from grass to asphalt.

In September 2019, Sonaca Aircraft inaugurated its assembly line of Sonaca 200.

References

External links
 Namur Suarlee Airfield- practical pilot information @ WikiAirports 
 Namur-Suarlée Airfield at PilotNav.com
 Namur-Suarlée Airfield at METAR-TAF.com
 Namur-Suarlée Airfield at OurAirports.com

Airfields of the United States Army Air Forces in Belgium
Airports in Namur (province)
Airports established in 1944
Buildings and structures in Namur (city)